Christian Gjestvang Petersen (born 25 May 1978) is a retired Norwegian football striker.

He was a part of a talented 1977–78 generation in Ski IL, also comprising future professionals Martin Andresen and Kenneth Løvlien and future coach Hans Erik Eriksen. They made the Oslo District team together with Hassan El Fakiri and Freddy dos Santos among others. Petersen represented Norway on u-17, u-18 and u-19 level.

Following a 1997 hat-trick in a friendly match against Tottenham Hotspur, in 1998 Petersen made his first-tier debut for Moss FK. Never becoming a top goalscorer, he went on to second-tier FK Oslo Øst in 2002. In the summer of 2003 he went to Fredrikstad FK. In the autumn of 2005 he went to Follo FK on loan, joining Follo permanently in the summer of 2006. He eventually changed position to defender, retiring after losing the 2010 Norwegian Football Cup Final.

References

1978 births
Living people
People from Ski, Norway
Norwegian footballers
Moss FK players
Manglerud Star Toppfotball players
Fredrikstad FK players
Follo FK players
Norwegian First Division players
Eliteserien players
Association football forwards
Norway youth international footballers
Sportspeople from Viken (county)